Vitaliy Vasylyovych Roman (born 15 April 2003) is a professional Ukrainian footballer who plays as a defender for Rukh Lviv.

Career
Born in Novyi Rozdil, Roman is a product of the local youth sportive school and the UFK-Karpaty Lviv youth sportive school system. His first trainer was Viktor Pavroznyk.

He played for FC Karpaty Lviv in the Ukrainian Premier League Reserves and later was promoted to the senior team after Karpaty was relegated into the Ukrainian Second League. Roman made his debut for FC Karpaty as a second-half substitute against FC Chernihiv on 19 September 2020. The following month, he signed with Ukrainian Premier League side FC Rukh Lviv.

He made his debut for Rukh Lviv on 21 August 2021 as a starter against SC Dnipro-1.

References

External links
 
 

2003 births
Living people
People from Novyi Rozdil
Ukrainian footballers
Ukraine youth international footballers
Ukraine under-21 international footballers
Association football defenders
FC Karpaty Lviv players
FC Rukh Lviv players
Ukrainian Premier League players
Ukrainian Second League players
Sportspeople from Lviv Oblast